1960 Nepal coup d'état was a coup d'état led by King Mahendra on 15 December 1960. The same day, he dismissed the cabinet of B.P. Koirala and imprisoned Koirala. On 13 April 1961, Mahendra made a televised appearance, in which he introduced Panchayat, a partyless political system.

See also 
2005 Nepal coup d'état

References

External links 

 

1960 in Nepal
Coups in Nepal